Pinu is a village on the coastline of Western Central Province, Papua New Guinea. The village is accessible by Hiritano highway. Before the construction of the highway, villagers used dugout canoes with sails to travel to and from Port Moresby. Pinu village is located between Aroa River and the Gallery Reach, and has access to food supply from the rivers, swamps, and the sea, as well as gardens and wild game from the plains. Hunting yields wallabies and wild pigs, while seasonal fishing yields fish, crabs, prawns, and shellfish. The surplus is usually sold in the city markets for goods such as sugar, tea, rice, flour, and other staples. There is no cash crop, but informal sales of coconut, betel nut, and other tree species such as eaglewood.

The village is the biggest and oldest settlement in the Kabadi area. Early foreign explorers and missionaries arrived on  the shores around the 1880s and immediately built churches and schools before modern services reached the area. The villagers passionately call themselves "Abadi Pinu." The word "Abadi" refers to power, ownership, and prestige by the paramount chief, while "Kabadi" refers to communal ownership or origin. The word Abadi literally means I own, and it is synonymous with the paramount chief.

Language 
The other historical name of Pinu is Vanuapaka or Hanuabadae. The name Pinu was not used often during the olden days. Another name used then was Ma'i Vanua village which belonged to the paramount chiefs Aro Ure and Ure Vado. As the original settlers and owners of all the land in Kabadi, the Pinu people are referred to as Kabadi or Abadi Pinu. Nearby villages such as Ukaukana, Kave ona, Kou ' puana, and Magabaira have very close ties to Pinu, having broken away from Pinu. Therefore, they are also referred to as Kabadi. The word 'Kabadi' was recorded by early European patrols. Some also recorded it as 'Kabatsi,' closely associating it to the Roro-speaking people. Over time, pronunciation of the word transformed gradually to Gabadi and was reinforced and used by Motuan interpreters who accompanied the colonial administrators in the 1600s.  

The local dialect spoken by the Kabadi people is called Abadi. Walter Mersh Strong wrote that the "Kabadi language is spoken in the villages of Vanuapaka, Ukaukana, Kapuana, Keviona, and Matapaile." It is still spoken in these villages today with minor changes in the adoption of pidgin and English words. The Summer Institute of Linguistics (SIL) has embarked on a project with the people of Kabadi to translate the Bible in the Kabadi language, for the purpose of language preservation.

History

The journey of the seven tribes 

Several migrations took place during the period when the Kabadis descended from Mt Yule. This is confirmed by their previous settlements along the way, including land that they own today. Along the plains of what is called 'Kabadi' today, and even retracing their paths to Meke'o and the Roro land, the Kabadi's still have old sagoes growing in places where they settled briefly. The people in those areas still speak of land previously owned by the Kabadis. There were no inhabitants or civilization when the Kabadi's arrived. They settled in different locations on this land; they progressively advanced at different times and locations strategically for purposes of defense or claiming of land. It was not until a couple of hundred years later, approximately around the 1700s and early 1800s, that interaction with the Koitabus and Motus, when differences emerged. Even the Keremas tracked an offender right to the paramount chief's doorstep, and war erupted between Kabadis and Keremas as a result. Consequently, warfare and chaos were ensured with horrific battles and murders perpetrated by all parties.

There is literature confirming this; Dr. W. Mersh Strong has written books depicting events and lives of the Roro- and Mekeo-speaking people, which have much resemblance to the Kabadi people. The writings further confirm these group of people came through Mt. Yule or Kovio. There were waves of migration of different groups of people including the Roros, the Mekeos, the Nara, the Kabadis and finally the Touras who have progressed further east towards present-day city of Port Moresby. This can also be proven through language, lifestyle and traditions of these different groups of people. For example, traditional headdresses, grass skirts, paintings are quite similar except each group differs in slight variation in face paint colors or grass skirt colors. Moreover, languages spoken demonstrate similar traits of sounds vowels and accent between the groups and can be easily understood. This basically demonstrate a coordinated movement of the same group; but at different points in time between one or perhaps two centuries. Evidence of these events are held in oral history and songs composed and passed on from generation to generations and are tightly guarded by the custodians.

The Kabadis settled and lived in small but robust settlements strategically positioned to protect each other from invaders. The Abadis were constantly at war between the Koitabus and Motuans and even with their former arch-rivals, the 'Revos' (Kerema), during the post-migration period. Missionary James Chalmers reported that the Kabadi were friendly with the Doura but "at bitter enmity" with the Koitabu, giving the following story as the reason: the Kabadi had attacked Lealea, a village in Caution Bay, in revenge for murder, killing several Koitabuans; in response, the Lealeans and Koitabuans attacked the village of Matapaila, killing most of the inhabitants. However, survivors of that attack managed to rally fighters quickly from nearby villages, who in turn attacked and killed the Leleans and Koitabuans who had been celebrating their victory at Matapaila.

The Kabadi people through oral history recorded and passed on by a folk song talks about the Koitabu warlord surrounding Matabaila with his warriors, and attacking the village. Kere, while visiting his concubine sensed the danger and raced all the way to Vanuapaka; gathered reinforcement, return, and the Kabadis surrounded them and murdered all of them, presented the 'price kill' to the paramount chief. The location upon which the battle took place was called Eke'ekena, a splinter tribe of Ivei. Today, the Eke'ekena people lay claim to this location which was renamed after the battle, and today it is called 'Amadi'. The Abadis withstood on-going wars for over two centuries and today stand proud to stake claim to the land they invaded, conquered and live to tell the tale. Oral citations of warriors like 'Boi Pipi' and numerous others are testament to this claim. "Tamate" also stated in his writings about the Kabadis constant war thus, saw the urgent need for peace.

Oral history states seven tribes migrated together and eventually settled on the Kabadi land. The seven tribes had their respective chiefs who were tasked with specific roles. These are head warriors, magicians or sorcerers, messengers, and interpreters. To this day, there are still seven tribes with seven clan chiefs. During the arrival of the colonisers, government officials who visited the Abadi plains encouraged people to move and settled together in villages. This was to ensure the Crown accounted for everyone, and to ensure much-needed services can be provided to them. The early patrol officers that visited the villages on the Gabadi plain named the villages 'Vanuapaka' which literally means 'big village', due to it been the political and administrative center, while there were satellite villages such as Ukaukana, keveona, Matepaila villages - according Seligman who wrote in his book The Melanesians of British New Guinea 'the three best known villages of Kabadi Vanuapaka, kopuana and Ukaukana'. p. 27 subnotes. Even so, other settlements continued to exist around the Abadi plains which grew with families and clans moving to strategic locations for easy access to food, and also protect the lands acquired by the Chief. The main tribe called the Vanuapaka was led by the Paramount Chief Aro Ure Aba moura (I), all the other tribes functioned around the sovereignty of the chief, he issued instructions and was the ultimate law. He personally named and put in place clan leaders, and his word was law.

The seven tribes still exist today, but are grouped into three major clans under Pinu village. Today, while there is strong resistance by some of the tribe to these realities, the literature affirms some of these facts, such ownership of land. The 'Queenslander' article dated 27 October 1883 and archived in the National Library of Australia highlights an event led by William Lawes and James Chalmers and Government officials to investigate a land sale dubbed the Pretended Land Sale in New Guinea, page 693(3) states clearly Ure Vado as the rightful owner of land, reiterating that Paramount chiefs ownership of all the land.

Chief system
The Chief system of Kabadi is part of its own identity. The Kabadis exist together with this authority since their origin. Both oral history and documents indicate line of Chiefs dating back beyond the arrival of the white man and churches. Estimations indicate generations dating back three centuries or more and can be justified by the achievement of the Chiefs and how they conduct themselves. This in itself demonstrates a system of power, primitive but effective system of governance which has now borne fruits of success generations later. One example is the use of this system by the colonial government to coerce the Kabadis into accepting the government and the early churches by using the chief system. The early penetration by British and Australian government officer's were made possible by the chief through interpreters and the chief's 'remo'.

The Chief system of Kabadi people has strong resemblance to the Mekeo, Roro and Nara people. This form of government system is tyrannical in nature, yet had a unique form of administration, with barao or roe for meetings to convene, a policing network that maintained order and peace. Oral history links the Vanuapaka tribe to Kivori and Waima tribes, with family ties still in existence. While this system was basic, it had maintained a well balance power base that kept the tribe together from its migration period between the 1400s and 1600s. During the period of settlement in the 1700s and 1800s, the system somewhat integrated the feudal style power also, with the chief granting lease of land to individuals or families who have made significant contributions to the tribe particular in bravery in warfare, and in participation in conquer of land, or through marriages to the chief family. The ownership of land is centred with the paramount chief, as evident in all documents relating to lease of land in the mid and late 1800s in the Abadi plains, notably the Galley Reach, Camp 48, Rogers Airstrip.

Aro Ure and Ure Vado 
The chiefs held two names which represents power, wealth, and prestige namely 'Aro Ure I' and 'Ure Ure I'. Two chiefs who were brothers featured prominently in the history of Abadis; The elder Aro Ure was the Paramount Chief, while his younger sibling was a fierce warrior. The chief line is still been maintained today with the paramount chief and his clan chiefs. The clan chiefs also maintain their 'Barao's or verandah's as a symbol of authority. 

It is believed that during the migration period, both Chiefs led the Kabadi's and their men and women to the present locations. Fierce encounters with the Motuan and the Koitabuans resulted in a period of hostility that would have last over two centuries or so; before the period of the London Missionary Society (LMS) in the late 1800s. There were sporadic attacks in revenge by the Kabadis to the east against the Lealeas and Boeras, even Manumanu who had previously settled on the other side of the mouth of galley reach river then. Their raids on the Motuans and the Koitabus further beyond the Abadi plains to capture hunting, fishing, and gardening grounds in the Galley Reach areas and beyond. Legends and folk songs still depict scenes and battle fields of these encounters even in locations as far as Lealea village. This particular detail is important as it states facts about a place and event that occurred then and was named 'kabadi gabugabu'.

The Kabadi history bears the hallmark of Ure Ure (Vado Kepo) who had wielded his authority during mid to late 1800s. This was the period of the commencement of peace, and this chief was credited for receiving the white man and churches into the Abadi area. Ure Vado was the younger brother of Aro Ure and had assumed his brother's leadership upon the latter's death. Aro Ure I had a son but was much younger to rule, and as such; Ure Vado assume the title of the chief and commenced his rule. Charmers wrote with interest of the willingness of Paramount chief Ure Vado to end all enmities and open up new trade with the people of the east and west also. Because of his honorable deeds; it is believed that Ure Vado was ordained as a deacon of the early LMS church. Similarly, his successor - Chief Aro Ure (Aba Mokuro), son of his elder brother continued this roll as soon as he assumed chieftainship after the death of Ure Vado.

The Kabadi chieftaincy system is patrimonial and only the blood male heir can assume the position of paramount chief. This system is particularly similar is most villages in the west of central province. There is only one instance recorded in literature and spoken of a female chief 'Queen Koloka' inherited the title from her father Naime. But, all Roro and Mekeo villages have male chiefs and this law is particularly upheld. In Kabadi, it is no exception, with much emphasis given to preparation and grooming of the chiefs at a very young age. In oral history, chieftaincy is passed between two brothers in Aro Ure and Ure vado, and cannot be passed onto female siblings, or even bring someone from another tribe in fear of distorting the blood line.

Early Church 
Ure Vado II with the aid of the early colonial government, and the LMS; saw the urgency to develop a policy of peaceful engagement, which was then encouraged by the LMS. James Chalmers saw this as an opportunity to bring peace in the area and end the barbaric culture of ethnic killing. Chief Ure Vado's notable contribution was organising the peace between the Kabadi's and the Motuan's and Koitabu's in 1880s. James Chalmers noted: "Ure Vado came in about 8 o'clock. It was interesting to watch the meeting between the Lealeans and him. They rubbed noses and threw their arms around one another, and each expressed great pleasure at this meeting. Ure Vado said, "You have never been here before because of our fathers. Enough, let their enmity now die, and here is Kabadi before you to buy yams, bananas, and sugar-cane, whenever you like to come." The others replied "Tis because of these, God's men, we are enabling thus to meet: and we shall certainly come here in future for food. Often have we seen the laden canoes of the Boeras and Motuans pass our doors from here and wished we, too, could only secure some, but now we shall be as they are." This event was of such significance as it ushered in a new era of civilized co-existence with neighboring motuans and Koitabuans who would then become trade partners, bringing knowledge and extended network of relationship. 

Another documented event during this period was to do with a land grab by a Scotsman, Andrew Goldie, who had acted on behalf of a Sydney-based syndicate to acquire land in Kabadi under very suspicious circumstances; Goldie and John Cameron "prepared a document drawn in legal phraseology— a land transfer— which they had brought up to the Mission House for translation," and "Armed with this deed, and taking with them a certain amount of 'trade'— as articles such as hardware, cloth, and tobacco are called in the South Seas — they departed. They found a man in occupation of the land they coveted, and generously offered him articles to the value of about £65, which amount would represent about one penny per acre of 15,000. This arrangement suited the wily Papuan in the highest degree, as it subsequently turned out that he was only a tenant under the chief, Ure Vado. On learning this Messrs. Cameron and Goldie returned to Kabadi, taking with them more trade, interviewed the chief, and made terms with him, eventually paying him also an additional penny per acre in articles to the total amount, and taking a further 5,000 acres as a kind of reward." This event reverberated through the papers for some time.

Arrival of the churches 
The church had played a significant role in transforming the lives of the people. In the late 1800s, the London Missionary Society, landed in the area, and established stations, where the church and schools were built. The role and influence of the church then was made much easier with the approval of the Paramount chief, who then welcomed the early church to establish themselves in Pinu village. A church building was established with a school built to teach the people about God and basic English and maths. Everyone was forced to embrace this change, which subsequently led to people converting and accepting Christianity.

London Missionary Society (LMS)

Rev. James Chalmers.

Rev. Timoteo

Rev. Piri

Most traditional and customary beliefs have now given way to modern lifestyles with the establishment of government schools, with a wave of young people graduating and moving away to other provinces for education or work and bring back a change of thought pattern. A permanent church building was subsequently built in the 1960s which still stands where the old church and school were built, and today the area is called the station.

There are two churches that are active, namely, the United Church, which is the foundation church, and more recently, the Christian Revival Church (CRC), a mainstream church. Both churches have significantly contributed to the spiritual upkeep of the village people, and also maintain their respective church buildings which are used for Sunday worships and weekly gatherings.

Government services 

Pinu village falls under the political jurisdiction of Kairuku Hiri District with its district headquarters at Bereina. The political representation is under Kairuku Rural consisting of 17 Local Level Government (LLG) councils, represented by their respective elected councillors. The 17 LLGs elect a Council president who represents them in the Provincial Assembly. The provincial Assembly is responsible for ensuring services such as infrastructure in the form of roads, bridges, schools, health centres are established and maintained each year. The Provincial Assembly is chaired by the Provincial Governor, unless otherwise the incumbent holds a portfolio in the National Parliament, the chair position is voted for within the provincial assembly.

Pinu village has an elementary school and community school together covering Elementary Prep to Grade 8. The school is part of government school system that was originally a church school establish by London Missionary Society in early 1960s. The Government took full control of it after independence in 1975. By then it had already produce students that were attending Della Salle High School and Iarowari High School for the male students and Our ladies of Sacred Heart (OLSH) High School, and Marinville High School for the female students. There were also a few students that were attending Sogeri and Kerevat National High School, and many of them have gone on to tertiary institutions and other technical colleges.

These elite group of Pinu people today hold some very senior positions both in the Public Service, and the private sector. Most of them today enjoy the privileges of their own success, and live and work in the city of Port Moresby and elsewhere, and in turn, enlist their own children in private schools and government schools in the urban areas. Most of them have also contributed significantly to the development of this country in their respective duties, and also given their share of resources to Pinu Village.

Other services include the health service which is run by a medical orderly, and treat patients from the village and the nearby villages. There is no proper water supply, and the villagers draw water from the wells, and catch rain water for drinking, cooking and laundry. A river tributary flows close to the village and it is used for bathing and laundry.

It is also well documented that the road system to the village is in atrocious condition, and is inaccessible during rainy seasons. Pinu people, including Manumanu and Toutu are disadvantaged during the wet periods, and have to walk long hours to get to the main highway, or use sea transport to access Port Moresby for goods and services.

Projects 
In the early 1980s, a project was initiated between the people of Pinu and Ilimo Farm to farm Shogum. This project got off the ground and was managed by the Incorporated Land Owner group called Abadi Business Group. The business group was managed by locals the project was a success up until the Ilimo Farm ceased operations, and this caused the business to restrategise to sustain itself. despite many attempts to progress their business plans, the land owner group eventually ceased operations. It is believed small amounts of funds invested with commercial banks still earn a minimum interest and it is yet to be claimed. The Abadi Business group has since been deregistered by Investment Promotion Authority.

in the 1990s, the European Union through its Aid agency, built a solar operated pump system to pump water from underground water system to supply the village. Each clan was supplied with four thanks with taps to be accessed by each homes, however, this system has since ceased, with all tanks rusted and destroyed. This has somewhat put a huge burden on the women folk who have now resorted to fetching water from wells, which are sometimes unhealthy due to proximity of hole toilets.

In 2010, a group was formed by people from Pinu, Manumanu and Toutu villages to basically seek to improve the roads leading to their respective villages. The people had faced hardship, as at times they would be cut off from accessing utilities and services in the city. The group somewhat achieve their purpose merely as a pressure group, pushing the local member of Parliament Hon. Paru Aihi to improve the road. The Governor made possible some funds which were given and expedited for the project. However, this upgrade was short-lived the following year when the wet season reverted the condition of the road to its initial state. In 10 May 2012, two separate print media reported the elected member of Parliament, Hon. Paru Aihi, making a pledge of five million kina to the Pinu people from the LNG developer as part of its responsibility for the 'gas pipeline corridor' who will be affected by the pipeline. The funding was channeled through the provincial government, and will be drawn and paid to the contractor to build a proper all-weather road from the main highway all the way to Manumanu, including the Toutu road. Unfortunately, this project has not taken off, with the funds yet to be received, or has been diverted to other projects.

There were talks in 2012 about a rice project to be initiated by a Naima group, and endorsed by relevant authorities to farm rice on the Abadi plains. Meetings were organised by the stakeholders and the landowners; however, according to the Abadis, it is crucial to recognise the authority to the land itself first. While the rice project has pushed for Incorporate Land Groups to be formed, Abadi Pinu must chair, let alone be lead negotiators in, any project to be introduced and implemented on the Abadi plains because, historically, Chiefs Aro Ure and Ure Vado have been documented as signatories to all previous land mobilisation programs. The Abadis have also incorporated an ILG with the Lands Department in anticipation of any future projects in the Abadi plains.

Additional information 
In the mid 1800s, a portion of land was sold by a custodian called Naime Arua near Kabadi, to a syndicate. Two names were prominent; Cameron and Goldie, while, texts in archives show that both were acting on behalf of a Sydney syndicate. Goldie had previously decided to settle in New Guinea. In May 1878 he had bought land near Hanuabada and set up a trading store. In September 1883 he joined J. B. Cameron, agent of a Sydney syndicate, in buying 17,000 acres (6880 ha) at Kabadi. This purchase defied native custom and poisoned his good relations with William Lawes. On the establishment of the protectorate Goldie and Cameron sought recognition of the transaction and parted company when it was refused. In 1886 the government decided to remove European settlement from the Hanuabada area. In exchange for his property Goldie was offered six blocks in the new township at Granville West but after a vigorous paper war with Anthony Musgrave was compensated with £400 for his improvements, and given fifty suburban acres (20 ha) and three town allotments on which he built Port Moresby's first store in January 1887. Despite a report of his death in 1886 Goldie visited Sydney in 1891 but died soon after his return to Port Moresby on 20 November. Although evidence on his estate was destroyed in World War II, he left 3750 shares in Burns Philp & Co. Ltd to three sisters and two brothers.

The archives further showed that the paramount chief of Kabadi disputed the land deal. His argument was on the fact that the said culprit; Naime Arua was never the owner, but a custodian. A public court was initiated where Naime Arua admitted to not owning the land and it was Paramount Chief of Kabadi Ure Vado that owned all the land.

In the course of all of these events, missionary James Chalmers protested to the British Empire by formally writing a letter through the Queensland and New Zealand court system. Moreover, Governor Scratchley had taken a personal interest in the land saga and had done his own investigations with documented facts presented to the authorities. The Governor also presented the case to the Crown; citing the land transactions illegal. His writings have also indicated the true land owner was Ure Vado and his nephew, Aro Ure.

The administration was up and running by the early 1900s, and by 1908, an important occasion took place which a signing ceremony between the landowners and the Crown, effectively transferring ownership of the Galley Reach area to the Crown or State for a 99 years lease.

The Department of Lands and Physical Planning issued a 'Notice To Treat' through the provincial lands authority as soon as the 99-year lease had expired. The Abadi Pinu Land Group Incorporation (ILG) Chairman and his executive then submitted in response to this notice. Under the Lands Act 1996, Section 12 subsection (2) the ILG notes gross abuse of process by the State agent, as provisions that protect the rights of the indigenous owners was not adhered to with the Abadi Pinu ILG not receiving the response in the given time. Even, subsection (5) calls for compensation, which did not eventuate. More recently, towards the end of 2015, the Department issued notices of compulsory acquisitions of portion 406, 421,422,423,424, and further acquisitions in January 2016 for renewal of Agricultural Leases under section 120 (2) portion 149, 150, 151, 154, 185, 189,142, 196,148, 195, 134, all of which are under Milinch Manu, Fourmil Aroa, Central Province. Tragically, The real owners, the Abadi Pinu, Kabadi people have not benefited at all. The Companies listed are British New Guinea Development Limited, Kanosia Estates Limited, and Veimauri Plantations Ltd, and there is an urgent need to verify and cross-check all the record and whether due process was adhered to by the agent of the State.

This document and various other lease-related documents prove beyond doubt the ownership of the land area of Abadi, and the authority that existed and was recognised then. To this day, the social structure and authority still exist today, and has stood the change of times, a testament to the people of Abadi-Pinu.

'Manumanu Land 2015–2016.'

In late 2015, the Government of Papua New Guinea though its various agencies had instituted and acted through the Defense Policy to identify land in the Kabadi Area to build infrastructure for the Papua New Guinea Defense Force. The corresponding actions led to the department of Lands and Physical Planning issuing Gazzetal Notices in late December 2015 of compulsory acquisition of land in Kabadi. Ironically, this land is linked to the actual land deal transacted by Cameron and Goldie in 1883.

References

Populated places in Central Province (Papua New Guinea)